Homecoming Song (translit. To tragoudi tis epistrofis) is a 1983 Greek drama film directed by Yannis Smaragdis. It was entered into the 13th Moscow International Film Festival.

Cast
 Stathis Giallelis as Antonis Melissinos
 Katia Dandoulaki as Eleni
 Nikos Armaos
 Vina Asiki
 Kostas Basis
 Dimitris Dagas
 Yiota Festa
 Thodoris Gonis (as Thodoros Gonis)
 Anthi Gounari

References

External links
 

1983 films
1983 drama films
Greek drama films
1980s Greek-language films